Gonna Make It is a Mediacorp Channel 8 romance drama that was broadcast from 30 September 2013 to 25 October 2013 and consist of 20 episodes. It stars Julie Tan, Bryan Wong, Xu Bin, Edwin Goh and Ya Hui as the casts of the series. The show aired at 9pm on weekdays and had a repeat telecast at 8am the following day.

Cast

Trivia
Edwin Goh's 2013 drama after Don't Stop Believin.
Bryan Wong returns to acting after 5 years. He last acted in the sitcom Folks Jump Over The Wall in 2007.

Overseas broadcast
This drama is the fourteenth drama on Malaysian satellite television Astro to be broadcast concurrently with Singapore, two weeks' behind the original telecast.

Awards & Nominations

Star Awards 20
Gonna Make It is nominated for 5 awards in the Star Awards 20.

See also
List of programmes broadcast by Mediacorp Channel 8
List of Gonna Make It episodes

References

Mediacorp Chinese language programmes
Singapore Chinese dramas
Channel 8 (Singapore) original programming